村 may refer to:

 Villages of China
 邨, a variant character of 村 usually referring to public housing in Hong Kong
 Villages of Japan

Disambiguation pages with Chinese character titles